One ship and one naval base of the Royal Australian Navy have been named HMAS Melville, after Melville Island.

, a naval base in Darwin, which operated from 1940 until its destruction by Cyclone Tracy in 1974
, a Leeuwin-class hydrographic survey vessel commissioned in 2000 and active as of 2016

See also
, three ships of the Royal Navy

Royal Australian Navy ship names